"You Never Know" is a 1996 song recorded by Swedish-Norwegian Eurodance group Solid Base, released as the fourth single from their debut album, Finally (1996). It is sung by lead vocalist Isabelle Heitman, who also co-wrote the lyrics and was successful especially in Scandinavia, where it peaked at number four in Norway and number 12 in Finland; it also charted in Romania. An accompanying music video was also made for the song, filmed in Gamla stan and directed by Mark Nava in Stockholm, Sweden. It was published on YouTube in February 2012, and as of May 2021, the video has been viewed almost 2 million times.

Track listing
 CD maxi, Scandinavia
"You Never Know" (Original Version) – 2:58
"You Never Know" (Extended Mix) – 4:19
"You Never Know" (Peo De Pit Mix) – 3:46
"You Never Know" (Viennas Short Mix) – 3:55
"You Never Know" (Peo De Pit X-10-Ded-Mix) – 5:28

 CD maxi (Remixes), Scandinavia
"You Never Know" (Funk Mix) – 3:40
"You Never Know" (R&B Mix) – 3:28
"You Never Know" (Extended Funk Mix) – 4:18
"You Never Know" (Extended R&B Mix) – 3:51
"You Never Know" (Original Version) – 2:58

Charts

Weekly charts

Year-end charts

References

 

1996 singles
1996 songs
Solid Base songs
English-language Norwegian songs